Gunnar Meland (born 21 August 1947 in Trondheim) is a Norwegian curler and world champion. He participated on the winning team in the demonstration event at the 1988 Winter Olympics.

International championships
Meland is a two-time world champion, and has won two silver medals at the European Curling Championships.

References

External links

Living people
1947 births
Sportspeople from Trondheim
Norwegian male curlers
World curling champions
Norwegian curling champions
Curlers at the 1988 Winter Olympics
Olympic curlers of Norway
20th-century Norwegian people